Little Sahara may refer to:

 Little Sahara (Kangaroo Island), a sand dune system on Kangaroo Island in South Australia
 Little Sahara Recreation Area in Utah
 Little Sahara State Park in Oklahoma